Ammocryptocharax elegans is a species of South American darter. It is the type species in its genus.

References 

 

Crenuchidae
Taxa named by Stanley Howard Weitzman
Fish described in 1976
Fish of South America